Jasper Taekwan Cho (born February 12, 1986), a Canadian actor and art director based in South Korea. He gained attention through his roles in television series Descendants of the Sun (2016) and Man Who Dies to Live (2017).

Filmography

Film

Television drama

Stage

Television show

Awards and nominations

References

External links
 
 

1986 births
Living people
Canadian art directors
Canadian male film actors
Canadian male television actors
Canadian male stage actors
Canadian male musical theatre actors
Canadian male models
Canadian people of South Korean descent
Canadian male actors of Korean descent
Sheridan College alumni
University of Toronto alumni
Alumni of Falmouth University
Superstar K participants